Sir Francis Leigh (1592 – 13 December 1644) was an English politician who sat in the House of Commons in 1625.

Leigh was the son of Sir Oliph Leigh of Addington, Surrey. He matriculated at Trinity College, Oxford on 8 May 1607, aged 15. In 1610, he studied law at the Inner Temple. He was knighted in January 1613.

He was a justice of the peace for Surrey (1616-at least 1642), Kent (1627-at least 1642) and Middlesex (1630–39) and was appointed High Sheriff of Surrey and Sussex for 1621–22. He was a deputy lieutenant for Surrey by 1627 until at least 1631.

In 1625, he was elected member of parliament for Surrey.

He was a Gentleman of the Privy Chamber by 1625 until at least 1643.

Leigh died at the age of about 48 and was buried at Addington on 17 December 1644. He married twice: firstly Elizabeth, the daughter and heiress of William Mynterne of Thorpe, Surrey, with whom he had 3 sons (2 of whom predeceased him) and a daughter and secondly Christian, the daughter of Sir John Thynne of Longleat, Wiltshire, with whom he had 6 sons (of whom 2 predeceased him) and 2 daughters.

References

1592 births
1644 deaths
Alumni of Trinity College, Oxford
Members of the Inner Temple
English MPs 1625
High Sheriffs of Surrey
High Sheriffs of Sussex
Deputy Lieutenants of Surrey
Gentlemen of the Privy Chamber